The  is a kei car built by the Japanese carmaker Daihatsu from 2009 to 2018. Based on the L275 series Mira, it replaced the Mira Gino in the Daihatsu's lineup, complete with retro-inspired styling. It was launched in August 2009 and went on sale in September. The grade levels offered were L, X, Plus L, Plus X and range-topping Plus G, all powered by the  658 cc KF-VE three-cylinder petrol engine. Its main competitor was the Suzuki Alto Lapin, with both had distinctly retro styling. The production of the Mira Cocoa ended in March 2018 for the Mira Tocot and it was later discontinued alongside the regular Mira in Japan on the same month.

The name "Cocoa" comes from the cocoa beverage.

Gallery

References 

Mira Cocoa
Cars introduced in 2009
2010s cars
Kei cars
Hatchbacks
Front-wheel-drive vehicles
All-wheel-drive vehicles
Vehicles with CVT transmission
Retro-style automobiles